Cortlan Brown (born May 31, 1989) is an American professional racing cyclist. He rode in the men's team time trial at the 2015 UCI Road World Championships.

References

External links

1989 births
Living people
American male cyclists
Place of birth missing (living people)
20th-century American people
21st-century American people